Odwa Mzuzo Ndungane (born 20 February 1981 in Mthatha, South Africa) is a former rugby union player that played first class rugby between 2000 and 2017. He played on the wing and spent the bulk of his career playing for the Sharks in the Super Rugby competition.

He made his Test debut against Italy in a 26–0 victory in Cape Town in 2008 ahead of, amongst others, his twin brother Akona. He retired after the 2017 Currie Cup Premier Division.

References

External links
Sharks profile

Springbok Rugby Hall of Fame
itsrugby.co.uk

1981 births
Living people
People from Mthatha
Xhosa people
Twin sportspeople
South African twins
South African rugby union players
South Africa international rugby union players
Sharks (rugby union) players
Sharks (Currie Cup) players
Bulls (rugby union) players
Blue Bulls players
Border Bulldogs players
Rugby union wings
Rugby union players from the Eastern Cape